Karate was an African Games event at its inaugural edition in 1991 and has continued to feature prominently at the competition in each of its subsequent editions.

Editions

External links

 
Sports at the African Games
All-Africa Games
All-Africa Games